Mississippi Heights Academy was a institution of learning designed to prepare boys for entrance to college or university located in Blue Mountain, Mississippi. Founded in 1904 by Dr. B. G. Lowrey, it closed in 1943.

References

Educational institutions established in 1904
Educational institutions disestablished in 1943
1904 establishments in Mississippi